José Luis Serna Alzate (17 February 193628 September 2014) was a Catholic Church bishop.

Born in the Second Spanish Republic town of Aranzazu on 17 February 1936, José Luis Serna Alzate was ordained a Catholic priest on 23 December 1961.  On 15 November 1978, Serna Alzate was appointed as both the vicar apostolic of Florencia, Caquetá in Colombia, as well as the titular bishop of Cartennae.  His next appointments were as bishop of Florencia on 9 December 1985, and then as bishop of the Roman Catholic Diocese of Líbano–Honda in the Tolima Department of Colombia.  Serna Alzate resigned on 12 July 2002, and died twelve years later on 28 September 2014.

Notes

1936 births
2014 deaths
20th-century Roman Catholic bishops in Colombia
21st-century Roman Catholic bishops in Colombia
apostolic vicars
20th-century Roman Catholic titular bishops

People from Caldas Department
Roman Catholic bishops of Florencia
Roman Catholic bishops of Líbano–Honda